Jumla District, is one of the ten districts of the Karnali province of Nepal. Its territory lies between longitudes 81⁰ 28' and 82⁰ 18' East, and between latitudes 28⁰ 58' and 29⁰ 30' North.

The Nepali language (then known as Khas language) originated in the Sinja Valley. Sinja was the capital of Khas Kingdom, and the dialect called "Khas Bhasa" is still spoken among that region's people.

History

Khasa Kingdom
Jumla was a part of Khasa kingdom during the 11th to 13th century. After 13th-century, Khasa Kingdom collapsed and divided into Baise Rajya (22 principalities) in the Karnali-Bheri region and the Kingdom of Jumla was one of them.

Kingdom of Jumla
The Jumla Kingdom was one of the many kingdoms that dotted Nepal before its reunification by King Prithvi Narayan Shah of Gorkha and later by his younger son Bahadur Shah. The kingdom was founded around 1404 when Baliraja, who married the daughter of the last ruler of the Yatse (Malla) Kingdom, succeeded his father-in-law. It was one of the most powerful kingdoms in western Nepal, being one of the 22 Baise principalities of the Karnali region which had once been part of the larger Yatse Kingdom. After centuries of intermittent warfare, it appropriated the kingdom of Mustang in 1760. In the late 18th century the Jumla kingdom successfully defended itself against the first attack by King Prithivi Narayan Shah, and legend even has it that he got injured in the battle. Later, with the help of the kingdoms surrounding Jumla, Bahadur Shah attacked again and annexed Jumla for the Gorkha kings in 1789. The Jumla kings were Thakuris (Sijapati, Malla, Shahi) like the Gorkha Kings.

The Jumla Kingdom belonged to the more extensive pre-unification kingdoms in Nepal. At the height of its power it extended from Mustang in the east to present-day Uttarakhand, a state in modern-day India, territory that the Kingdom of Nepal lost to the East India Company in 1816 during the partition of Nepal. The Jumla kings belonged to the Kalyal dynasty, linked to the Mewar clan of Rajasthan, India. There have also been marriages between the Jumla royal family and the Shah's royal family of Nepal. The direct descendants of the erstwhile Jumla royal family include Nepali Film legend Nir Shah, Maya Kumar Shah SP (Retd.) of Nepal Police, former Director-General of Nepal Electricity Authority Harish Chandra Shah, DIGP (Retd) Sher Bahadur Shah, Colonel Nepal Army (Retd.) Bhim Bahadur Shah and AIGP (Retd.) of Nepal Police, Surendra Bahadur Shah.

Kings of Jumla

The kings of Jumla, post-1400:
 Baliraja 1404-1445
 Vaksaraja 1445-? (son)
 Vijayaraja (son)
 Visesaraja fl. 1498 (son)
 Vibhogaraja (?)
 Matiraja (?)
 Sahiraja (?)
 Bhanasahi c. 1529-90 (son)
 Saimalsahi c. 1590-1599 (son)
 Vasantaraja 1599-1602 (son)
 Visekaraja 1599-1602 (brother)
 Vikramasahi 1602-c. 1635 (brother)
 Bahadurasahi c. 1635-65 (son)
 Virabhadrasahi 1665-75
 Prithvipatisahi 1676-1719 (son)
 Surathasahi 1719-40 (son)
 Sudarasanasahi 1740-c. 1758 (son)
 Suryabhanasahi c. 1758-89 (son)

Geography and climate

The Higher Himalayan Region consists of Patarasi and Kanjirowa Himalayan ranges. The major rivers in Jumla are Hima, Tila and Jawa.

Demographics
At the time of the 2011 Nepal census, Jumla District had a population of 108,921. Of these, 98.8% spoke Nepali, 0.6% Tamang, 0.3% Sherpa and 0.1% other languages as their first language.

In terms of ethnicity/caste, 60.4% were Chhetri, 10.9% Hill Brahmin, 7.4% Kami, 7.4% Thakuri, 7.1% Sarki, 2.5% Damai/Dholi, 1.1% Sanyasi/Dasnami, 1.1% Tamang, 0.9% Lohar, 0.2% Gharti/Bhujel, 0.2% Newar, 0.1% Bhote, 0.1% Gurung, 0.1% Magar, 0.1% Musalman, 0.1% Thakali and 0.2% others.

In terms of religion, 97.9% were Hindu, 1.2% Buddhist, 0.7% Christian, 0.1% Muslim and 0.1% others.

In terms of literacy, 54.0% could read and write, 3.4% could only read and 42.5% could neither read nor write.

Divisions

On 10 March 2017 Government of Nepal restricted old administrative structures and announced 744 new local level units (9 added later) as per the new constitution of Nepal 2015,

According to new structure Jumla district is divided into 1 municipality (urban) and 7 rural municipality:

Municipalities
 Chandannath (UM)
 Kankasundari (RM)
 Sinja (RM)
 Hima (RM)
 Tila (RM)
 Guthichaur (RM)
 Tatopani (RM)
 Patarasi (RM)
Note: UM=Urban Municipality, RM=Rural Municipality

Ethno Medicine 
Jumla along with Humla, Dolpa and Mustang districts have a history of people using traditional plants for medicine. Research has shown there are upto 109 different species of Ethnomedicine in these areas.

Ethno Veterinary Medicine 
Fifteen different species of plants are known to be used in ethno-veterinary practices in Jumla.

Health 
A 2019 study on blood types of people in Jumla revealed A positive is the most common blood type while B positive was the most requested from the blood bank at Karnali Academy of Health Sciences. It also states the most frequent demand for blood came from the gynecological department.

A study on Health facility preparedness of maternal and neonatal health services in 2021 found that Health facilities have better staffing levels, have access to essential medicines and provision of ambulance transport of women and children.

Women of Jumla 
As part of research on the leading causes of death among Nepali women of child-bearing age, a study on Mental Health and Suicide among women in Jumla has found that there are six issues when it comes to women's lives and views on suicide: mental health issues; economics; education; domestic issues; differential gender impacts; suicide and thoughts about it.

A study aimed at finding the frequency of teenage pregnancy and its outcomes revealed that it was 22% among total deliveries and that maternal complication accounted for 33% of the total pregnancies. Awareness about teenage pregnancy is low.

Women of Jumla were one of the first to be recruited into the Maoist Insurgency.

Child marriage is prevalent in Jumla as of 2019.

64.4% of women in Jumla are illiterate.

Lagi-Lagitya 
An "inter-caste economic dependency in a long-term hereditary contractual labor relations" is called Lagi-Lagitya. The castes of Bahun, Thakuri, Chettri who own land but don't till themselves employ low caste groups of Kami and Sarki to work on their lands.

Natural Resources 
Jumla is rich in Non Timber Forest Products (NTFP) namely medicinal plants and aromatics. 41% of the district is covered with Forest and rangeland.

Animals and Crops 
The Himalayan Black Bear damages crops and attacks livestocks but locals support the animal's conservation.

The red panda (Ailurus fulgens), a threatened carnivore species is found in Jumla.

Rice Cultivation 
Jumli Marshi is a high altitude rice variety that is though to have been cultivated in Jumla since 1300 years ago.

See also 
Jumla: A Nurse's Story

Gallery

References

External links

 
Districts of Nepal established during Rana regime or before
Districts of Karnali Province